An election to the Carmarthenshire County Council was held in March 1919. It was preceded by the 1913 election and followed by the 1922 election.

Overview of the result

The elections were less politicised than in the pre-war era, with more candidates being elected without any declared political affiliations. The non-political nature of the contests was emphasized by the traditionally Conservative Carmarthen Journal, which had long opposed the politicized nature of local authority elections. Other publications, however, included political affiliations in their coverage of the results.

Boundary changes

There were no boundary changes.

Unopposed returns

22 of the 53 divisions were uncontested, with the majority of the unopposed returns being in the rural parts of the county.

Contested elections

A greater proportion of the sitting members were challenged than had been the case in most pre-war contests and a number of prominent members were defeated including Mervyn Peel, former Conservative candidate for East Carmarthenshire, at Llangadog. In Carmarthen, the Rev. Andrew Fuller Mills was defeated by an ex-serviceman.

In Llanelli, D.C. Parry, a Liberal member of the Council since its formation, was defeated by Gwendoline Trubshaw, who received the support of the Discharged and Demobilised Soldiers' and Sailors' Association.

Other contests in Llanelli town and in the surrounding areas saw significant support for the Labour party, which captured a number of seats, building on the strong result achieved by Dr J.H. Williams at the General Election the previous year.

In some cases there is an ambiguity in the sources over the party affiliations and this is explained below in relation to individual ward contests where relevant.

Retiring aldermen

The aldermen who retired at the election were

Summary of results

This section summarises the detailed results which are noted in the following sections. As noted, there was ambiguity in some cases over the party affiliation.

This table summarises the result of the elections in all wards. 51 councillors were elected.

|}

|}

|}

Ward results

Abergwili

Ammanford

Bettws

Caio

Carmarthen Eastern Ward (Lower Division)

Carmarthen Eastern Ward (Upper Division)

Carmarthen Western Ward (Lower Division)

Carmarthen Western Ward (Upper Division)

Cenarth

Cilycwm

Conwil

Kidwelly

Laugharne

Llanarthney

Llanboidy

Llandebie

Llandilo Rural

Llandilo Urban
Lord Dynevor captured the seat previously held by J. Towyn Jones MP.

Llandovery

Llandyssilio

Llanedy

Llanegwad

Llanelly Division.1

Llanelly Division 2

Llanelly Division 3

Llanelly Division 4

Llanelly Division 5

Llanelly Division 6
In pre-war contests, Joseph Roberts had stood as a Labour candidate.

Llanelly Division 7

Llanelly Division 8

Llanelly Rural, Berwick

Llanelly Rural, Hengoed

Llanelly Rural, Westfa and Glyn

Llanfihangel Aberbythick
Thomas Thomas received the support of the Trades and Labour Council. However, he was regarded as a Liberal candidate in most quarters.

Llanfihangel-ar-Arth

Llangadock

Llangeler

Llangendeirne

Llangennech

Llangunnor

Llanon

Llansawel

Llanstephan

Llanybyther

Mothvey

Pembrey North

Pembrey South

Quarter Bach

Rhydcymmerai

St Clears

St Ishmael

Trelech

Whitland

Election of aldermen

In addition to the 53 councillors the council consisted of 17 county aldermen. Aldermen were elected by the council, and served a six-year term.

The following aldermen stood down at the election. None of them stood at the election and were re-elected at the statutory meeting. Labour councillor Dr J.H. Williams gave notice that he would propose that, in future, all aldermen should seek re-election to the Council before retaining their seats on the aldermanic bench.

Rev William Davies, Llandeilo
David Evans, Whitland
William Griffiths, Llanelli
Thomas Jones, Llanelli
W.N. Jones, Ammanford
Rev E.B. Lloyd, Bwlchnewydd
John Lloyd, Abegwili
James Phillips, St Clears
J. Lloyd Thomas, Feryside

References

1919
1919 Welsh local elections